Brendan Rogers (born April 1994) is a dual player of Gaelic games, i.e. hurling and Gaelic football, who plays for Derry Championship club Slaughtneil and the Derry senior teams.

Career

Rogers first came to prominence as a dual player at club level with Slaughtneil. He has been involved during a golden age for the club and lined out when the club lost the All-Ireland club football finals in 2015 and 2017. Rogers has also won a combined total of six Ulster Club Championships and 13 County Championship titles across both codes. At inter-county level, he progressed through the minor and under-21 teams as a dual player before eventually joining the Derry senior teams in both codes. Rogers was part of the Nicky Rackard Cup-winning team in 2017.

Honours

Slaughtneil
Ulster Senior Club Football Championship: 2014, 2016, 2017
Ulster Senior Club Hurling Championship: 2016, 2017, 2019
Derry Senior Football Championship: 2014, 2015, 2016, 2017, 2020
Derry Senior Hurling Championship: 2013, 2014, 2015, 2016, 2017, 2018, 2019, 2020, 2021

Derry
Nicky Rackard Cup: 2017
Ulster Senior Football Championship 2022
BBC Sport Ulster final man of the match

References

1994 births
Living people
Derry inter-county hurlers
Derry inter-county Gaelic footballers
Dual players
Slaughtneil hurlers
Slaughtneil Gaelic footballers